Vardanes I was a king of the Parthian Empire from 40 to 46 AD. He was the heir apparent of his father Artabanus II, but had to continually fight against his brother Gotarzes II, a rival claimant to the throne. Vardanes' short reign ended when he was assassinated while hunting at the instigation of a party of Parthian nobles .

Name 
"Vardanes" (also spelled Bardanes) is the Latin attestation of the Middle Iranian name Wardān, meaning "rose". The name is transliterated in Greek as Ordanes  and Ordones , and in Hatran Aramaic as wrdn.

Biography 
In , Vardanes' father and reigning Parthian king Artabanus II died, entrusting his realm to Vardanes. However, the throne was seized by Gotarzes II, an adopted son of Artabanus II. Gotarzes had another of his brothers, Artabanus, along with his wife and child, executed shortly after. An uproar against this execution shortly followed, with an appeal being sent to Vardanes, who took Gotarzes by surprise and defeated him, after travelling 375 miles in two days. Vardanes was supported by the governors of the neighbouring Parthian provinces, and quickly gained control over most of the Parthian realm. 

The Mesopotamian city of Seleucia, which had been in rebellion since 35 AD, did not acknowledge Vardanes, who then besieged the city. However, the long siege of Seleucia resulted in Gotarzes gaining the upper hand in the conflict, allowing him to raise a new force and drive off Vardanes, who fled to Bactria in Central Asia. A contemporary bust of a Parthian king was discovered at the ancient court of the Yuezhis (early Kushans) in Khalchayan, Bactria, suggesting that this may represent Vardanes as he sought refuge, and possibly an alliance, at the Yuezhi court.

At the same time, Armenia suffered turmoil, when its Arsacid king Orodes, the brother of Vardanes, was deposed by the Roman emperor Claudius, who appointed the Pharnavazid prince Mithridates in his stead.   

Just before Vardanes and Gotarzes clashed in battle, they reached an accord after Gotarzes informed Vardanes of a conspiracy being planned against them by a prominent group. Under the accord Vardanes was to keep his crown, while Gotarzes became the ruler of Hyrcania. In June 42, Vardanes forced Seleucia to submit to the Parthians again after a rebellion of seven years. He significantly reduced the autonomy of the city and removed its privilege to mint its own coins. Around the same time, the Greek philosopher Apollonius of Tyana visited the court of Vardanes, who provided him with the protection of a caravan as he travelled to the realm of the Indo-Parthians. When Apollonius reached Indo-Parthia's capital Taxila, his caravan leader read Vardanes' official letter, perhaps written in Parthian, to an Indian official who treated Apollonius with great hospitality.

Encouraged by his recent triumphs, Vardanes prepared to invade and reconquer Armenia, but ultimately abandoned his plans, due to threats of war from the Roman governor of Syria, Gaius Vibius Marsus, and the renewed conflict with Gotarzes, who had terminated their accord. Vardanes defeated Gotarzes on the Erindes, a river situated on the Media-Hyrcania border. He then proceeded to conquer the remaining Parthian provinces, reaching as far as Aria. In  he was assassinated while hunting at the instigation of a party of Parthian nobles, who feared that their status might become endangered.

References

Bibliography

Ancient works 
 Tacitus, Annals

Modern works

Further reading 
  
  
  

1st-century Parthian monarchs
45 deaths
Year of birth unknown
Murdered Persian monarchs
1st-century Iranian people
1st-century murdered monarchs
1st-century Babylonian kings